Muhammed Dahmani (born 17 July 1975) is a Danish taekwondo practitioner. He competed in the men's 80 kg event at the 2000 Summer Olympics.

References

External links
 

1975 births
Living people
Danish male taekwondo practitioners
Olympic taekwondo practitioners of Denmark
Taekwondo practitioners at the 2000 Summer Olympics
Place of birth missing (living people)